Amolops nepalicus is a species of frog in the family Ranidae. It is endemic to Nepal and is only known from two localities in the Sankhuwasabha District. Common names Nepal sucker frog and Nepal cascade frog have been proposed for it.

Taxonomy
First described in 1991, Amolops nepalicus was brought into synonymy of Amolops marmoratus by works published in 2000–2004. This synonymy was questioned in 2012, but only formally rejected in 2020.

Description
Adult males measure  and adult females  in snout–vent length. The head is slightly longer than it is wide. The tympanum is distinct. The fingers have no webbing while the toes are fully webbed. There are few rounded tubercles
scattered on the dorsum whereas the belly is smooth; the dorsolateral fold is indistinct. The dorsal coloration is light brown or white with dark brown spots. Males have an external vocal sac.

Habitat and conservation
Threats to this poorly known species are not known. It is not known to present in any protected area.

References

nepalicus
Amphibians of Nepal
Endemic fauna of Nepal
Amphibians described in 1991